The Syrian opposition is the political structure of the Syrian National Coalition and associated groups opposing the Syrian government.

Syrian opposition may also refer to:

 Syrian Opposition Coalition or Syrian National Coalition, a coalition of opposition groups in the Syrian Civil War that was founded in 2012
 Popular Front for Change and Liberation, a coalition of Syrian political parties and the official political opposition within the People's Council of Syria
 National Democratic Rally (Syria), a banned opposition alliance in Syria
 National Salvation Front in Syria, a Syrian opposition political party founded and based in Belgium
 Free Syrian Army, a loose faction founded by officers of the Syrian Armed Forces to bring down the government of Bashar al-Assad
 Tahrir al-Sham, a group within the Syrian Opposition which governs the Opposition territory in northwest Syria
 Syrian National Army, a group within the Opposition that governs the rebel territory in northern Syria
 Maghaweir al-Thowra a group within the Opposition that governs the rebel territory in southeast Syria

See also
 Syrian civil war,  ongoing multi-sided civil war in Syria
 Syrian opposition–Islamic State in Iraq and the Levant conflict, conflict among factions of the Syrian opposition and Free Syrian Army throughout the Syrian Civil War
 Syrian Social Nationalist Party, a party in Lebanon, Syria, Jordan, Iraq and Palestine that advocates a Greater Syrian nation state
 Hizb ut-Tahrir, an international pan-Islamist and fundamentalist political organization